The 2022 Columbus Challenger II was a professional tennis tournament played on indoor hard courts. It was the twelfth edition of the men's tournament which was part of the 2022 ATP Challenger Tour. It took place in Columbus, United States between September 19 and 25, 2022.

Singles main draw entrants

Seeds

 1 Rankings are as of September 12, 2022.

Other entrants
The following players received entry into the singles main draw as wildcards:
  Justin Boulais
  Cannon Kingsley
  James Tracy

The following players received entry into the singles main draw as alternates:
  Nick Chappell
  Ezekiel Clark
  Omni Kumar

The following players received entry from the qualifying draw:
  Robert Cash
  Ryan Harrison
  Patrick Kypson
  Naoki Nakagawa
  Nathan Ponwith
  James Trotter

The following player received entry as a lucky loser:
  Strong Kirchheimer

Champions

Singles

  Jordan Thompson def.  Emilio Gómez 7–6(8–6), 6–2.

Doubles

 Julian Cash /  Henry Patten def.  Charles Broom /  Constantin Frantzen 6–2, 7–5.

References

Columbus Challenger II
2022 in sports in Ohio
September 2022 sports events in the United States
2022 in American tennis